Vernon Grimshaw (15 April 1916 – 21 June 1989) was an English cricketer: a right-handed batsman and leg break bowler who played 19 times for Worcestershire between 1936 and 1938. He averaged only 13.93 in that time, but his career did contain one undoubted highlight: scoring 103 while opening the batting against the New Zealanders in 1937.
He took only two first-class wickets, one each in successive matches in 1936. His victims were both substantial cricketers: Tom Brierley and Harry Storer.

Grimshaw played at least once in the Minor Counties Championship for Bedfordshire, scoring 0 against Buckinghamshire in August 1955.

Grimshaw was born in Roundhay, Leeds, Yorkshire; he died in Clifton, Bedfordshire at the age of 73.

Notes

References
 

1916 births
1989 deaths
English cricketers
Worcestershire cricketers
Bedfordshire cricketers
Cricketers from Leeds